KRD may refer to:
 .krd, the Internet geographic top-level domain for Kurdistan Region of Iraq
 Karad railway station, Maharashtra, India, station code
 Key rate duration in fixed-income attribution
 Key retainer device